Fersfield is a village and former civil parish, now in the parish of Bressingham, in the South Norfolk district, in the county of Norfolk, England. It was the home parish of Francis Blomefield, whose History of Norfolk documents the history of much of South Norfolk. In 1931 the parish had a population of 194. On 1 April 1935 the parish was abolished and merged with Bressingham.

History
Fersfield's name is of Anglo-Saxon origin and derives from the Old English for an area of open land where heifers were kept.

In the Domesday Book, Fersfield is listed as a settlement of 26 households in the hundred of Diss. In 1086, the village was divided between the East Anglian estates of King William I and Robert Malet.

Geography
Fersfield falls within the constituency of South Norfolk and is represented at Parliament by Richard Bacon MP of the Conservative Party. For the purposes of local government, the parish falls within the district of South Norfolk.

St. Andrew's Church
Fersfield's church is dedicated to Saint Andrew with the exterior dating from the Fourteenth and Fifteenth Centuries, with the interior largely the product of the Nineteenth Century. The remaining stained-glass takes the form of several roundels, likely from the Continent, depicting Saint Andrew, Saint Gregory and the Eagle of Saint John. The font dates from the Norman Conquest with St. Andrew's also holding memorials to the Norman knight, Robert du Bois and the English antiquarian and historian, Francis Blomefield.

RAF Fersfield

RAF Fersfield was built in 1943 for use by various formations from the Royal Air Force and the United States Army Air Forces on strategic-bombing missions of Continental Europe. Fersfield was the departure site for the mission that led to the death of Lt. Joseph P. Kennedy, Jr., the brother of future U.S. President, John F. Kennedy. After the Second World War, RAF Fersfield was briefly used as a venue for motor racing until it reverted to agricultural use.

Notable Residents
 Francis Blomefield (1705-1752)- Rector of Fersfield, antiquarian and historian

War Memorial
Fersfield's war memorial takes the form of a Celtic cross atop a square plinth located in St. Andrew's Churchyard, the memorial was unveiled in February 1921 after a fundraising effort led by Rev. C. E. Woode and subsequently unveiled in the presence of Col. Mornement and Bertram Pollock, Bishop of Norwich. The memorial lists the following names for the First World War:
 Cpl. Thornton Allum (1897-1917), 4th Battalion, Royal Norfolk Regiment
 Pvt. Jesse Hoskins (1895-1916), 8th Battalion, East Surrey Regiment
 Pvt. A. T. Vincent (d.1917), 5th Battalion, Royal Norfolk Regiment
 Pvt. Oscar E. Anderson (1896-1919), 7th Battalion, Royal Norfolk Regt.

References

External links

Villages in Norfolk
Former civil parishes in Norfolk
South Norfolk